Summer 2003 is an EP by the heavy metal band Anthrax released in 2003 by Nuclear Blast. It was an exclusive at Nuclear Blast mailorder and was released as an EP and as a "2 for 1" with the 2003 album We've Come for You All. It features the bonus cover tracks from the 2001 remasters of Sound of White Noise and Stomp 442, as well as the radio version of "Safe Home". This is Anthrax's last released album featuring Paul Crook on lead guitar.

Track listing
 "Safe Home (Radio Edit)" (John Bush, Rob Caggiano, Scott Ian, Frank Bello, Charlie Benante) – 4:18
 "Grunt & Click (Stomp 442 Session Recording)" (Bush, Ian, Bello, Benante) – 5:29
 "Dethroned Emperor (Celtic Frost cover)" (Tom Fischer) – 4:32
 "Celebrated Summer (Hüsker Dü cover)" (Bob Mould) – 4:25
 "Watchin' You (Kiss cover)" (Gene Simmons) – 3:38
 "Auf Wiedersehen (Cheap Trick cover)" (Rick Nielsen, Tom Petersson) – 3:32
 "Cowboy Song (Thin Lizzy cover)" (Phil Lynott, Brian Downey) – 5:03
 "London (The Smiths cover)" (Morrissey, Johnny Marr) – 2:53

2003 EPs
Anthrax (American band) EPs